Claire Mary O'Riordan (born 12 October 1994) is an Irish soccer defender and forward. , O'Riordan plays for Celtic of the Scottish Women's Premier League and the Republic of Ireland national team.

Early years
O'Riordan initially represented Limerick at county level in GAA and camogie.  She was a late convert to football after not having featured at underage level for her country.

Club career
O'Riordan started her senior career at Wexford Youths in the Irish Women's National League (WNL) where she spent five years. While at the club she won the WNL three times.

O'Riordan signed a professional contract for German Frauen-Bundesliga side MSV Duisburg in July 2018.  She played primarily as a centre-half in defence for the club.

After four years in Germany, O'Riordan signed for Celtic in August 2022.

International career
O'Riordan never played for Ireland at youth level, but won her first senior cap in a 1–0 defeat by Hungary at the 2016 Cyprus Women's Cup. She represented Ireland during their 2019 FIFA Women's World Cup qualification campaign.

References

1994 births
Living people
Sportspeople from Limerick (city)
Republic of Ireland women's association footballers
Republic of Ireland women's international footballers
MSV Duisburg (women) players
Women's association football midfielders
Wexford Youths W.F.C. players
Women's National League (Ireland) players
Frauen-Bundesliga players
Expatriate women's footballers in Germany
Irish expatriate sportspeople in Germany
Celtic F.C. Women players
Expatriate women's footballers in Scotland
Republic of Ireland expatriate association footballers
Irish expatriate sportspeople in Scotland
Scottish Women's Premier League players